is an anime written and illustrated by Shoichi Masuo.

Plot
Three warriors battle the forces of darkness when an archaeological expedition unleashes an ancient prophecy.

English Cast

Barbara Goodson as Mizuo Mashio
Bob Bergen as Kai
Dan Woren as Brukodan
Kerrigan Mahan
Kirk Thornton
Jeff Winkless
Richard Cansino

References

External links
 
 

1993 anime OVAs
Depictions of Genghis Khan on film